Spatalistis phulchokia is a species of moth of the family Tortricidae. It is found in Nepal. The habitat consists of Schima-Castanopsis forests.

The wingspan is about 21 mm. The forewings are cream with a slight brownish shade and sprinkled with cream brown and strigulated terminally. There are numerous silver dots and the markings have the form of three, nearly confluent, costal spots. They are rust brown suffused with black. The hindwings are whitish tinged with brown and brown postmedially.

Etymology
The species name refers to the type locality.

References

Moths described in 2012
phulchokia
Moths of Asia
Taxa named by Józef Razowski